Sclareolide is a sesquiterpene lactone natural product derived from various plant sources including Salvia sclarea, Salvia yosgadensis, and cigar tobacco.  It is a close analog of sclareol, a plant antifungal compound.

It is used as a fragrance in cosmetics and has been more recently marketed as a weight loss supplement, though there is no clinical evidence to support this effect.

References

Sesquiterpene lactones
Naphthofurans